Matteo Zanini (born 10 May 1994) is an Italian professional footballer who plays as a defender for  club Imolese.

Career
Born in Pavia, Lombardy, Zanini started his career at hometown club A.C. Pavia. He was the member of the reserve team in 2011–12 season. He made his first team debut during 2012–13 Lega Pro Prima Divisione season. On 6 December 2012 he signed his first fully professional contract. However at the end of season, on 29 June 2013, he was sold to Serie B club Cesena in co-ownership deal for €400,000 in 3-year contract, with Caio De Cenco moved to Pavia also in co-ownership deal for €350,000.

On 18 July 2013 he returned to Pavia along with Cesena team-mate Fabio Reato (whom Cesena signed him in 2012). Pavia finished as the last of Group A in 2013–14 Lega Pro Prima Divisione season, but due to the merger of the prime and second division of Lega Pro, the team did not relegate.

On 20 June 2014 the co-ownership of Zanini, Reato and De Cenco were renewed. In June 2015 Zanini joined Cesena outright.

In summer 2015 Zanini joined Messina.

On 2 August 2016 Zanini joined Akragas in a 2-year contract. On 31 January 2017 Zanini was signed by Catanzaro in a -year deal.

On 17 October 2018, he signed with Lucchese.

On 18 July 2019, he signed with Reggio Audace.

On 1 February 2021 he joined Paganese.

References

External links
 AIC profile (data by football.it) 

1994 births
Sportspeople from Pavia
Footballers from Lombardy
Living people
Italian footballers
Association football defenders
F.C. Pavia players
A.C. Cesena players
Cosenza Calcio players
A.C.R. Messina players
S.S. Akragas Città dei Templi players
U.S. Catanzaro 1929 players
S.S.D. Lucchese 1905 players
A.C. Reggiana 1919 players
Paganese Calcio 1926 players
Imolese Calcio 1919 players
Serie C players